New York's 5th State Assembly district is one of the 150 districts in the New York State Assembly. It has been represented by Republican Assemblyman Douglas M. Smith since 2018.

Geography 
District 10 is in Suffolk County, and covers portions of the towns of Brookhaven and Islip.

Recent election results

2022

2020

2018

2018 special

2016

2014

2012

2010

Members 

 John Cashmore (1923)

References 

5
Suffolk County, New York